Rakish Phillip Bingham (born 25 October 1993) is an English professional footballer who plays as a forward for National League South side Ebbsfleet United. 

He has also previously played for Wigan Athletic, Falkirk, Mansfield Town, Hartlepool United, Cheltenham Town, Doncaster Rovers Hamilton Academical and Dundee United.

Career

Wigan Athletic
Bingham joined Wigan's under-18 side in 2010 and made his debut for the reserves in April 2011. He signed his first professional contract at the end of the 2011–12 season. He soon attracted interest from Premier League clubs, such as Manchester City, Newcastle United and Fulham.

On 27 August 2013, Bingham joined Scottish Championship side Falkirk on loan until the end of the year. He made 13 appearances, 11 in the league, but did not score during his time with the Bairns and returned to Wigan in January.

Mansfield Town
On 31 August 2014, Bingham joined Mansfield Town on a free transfer after leaving Wigan.

He scored on his Mansfield debut on 6 September 2014 in the 14th minute, a close range tap-in after the initial shot by Fergus Bell was saved, in the 1–2 away victory against Exeter City. He also scored twice against Carlisle United in a 3–2 home win for Mansfield weeks later on 20 September 2014.

Following his return from a loan period with Hartlepool United, Bingham scored his fourth goal of the season, in a 1–0 win over Luton Town, followed up with goals against Wimbledon and Cambridge United. In his first season, Bingham went on to make 28 league appearances, scoring six times for the club.

Hartlepool United
On 2 January 2015, Manager Adam Murray agreed a loan move for Bingham to join Hartlepool United until the end of the season. Murray explained his decision, saying the loan would let Bingham get regular playing time. He made his Hartlepool debut the next day, making his first start and playing 90 minutes, in a 1–0 against Wycombe Wanderers. Bingham then scored his first Hartlepool goal in the next game, a 2–0 win over Cheltenham Town On 2 February 2015, having scored once in five appearances, Bingham was recalled by Mansfield.

At the end of the season Mansfield announced that Bingham would be meeting with Murray to discuss his future at the club, then it was announced on 20 May 2015, that having been released by Mansfield, he would be returning to Hartlepool. Bingham explained his decision to re-join Hartlepool, saying that he wanted to continue working with Manager Ronnie Moore.

Hamilton Academical
Bingham signed for Hamilton Academical in August 2016. On 9 November 2016, he signed a contract extension, keeping him at Hamilton until May 2018. In November 2017, Bingham extended his contract by a further year keeping him at the club until May 2019. He left Hamilton in January 2019.

Cheltenham Town
After his release by Hamilton, Bingham signed a short-term contract with Cheltenham Town on 31 January 2019.

Doncaster Rovers
Having been without a club after leaving Cheltenham at the end of the 2018–19 season, Bingham signed for League One club Doncaster Rovers in November 2019. He left the club in January 2020, his contract having expired.

Dundee United
On 6 February, Bingham signed for Dundee United on a contract until the end of the 2019–20 season. In May 2020 and was announced that he would be one of eight players leaving the club in the summer following the expiry of his contract.

Ebbsfleet United
On 3 September 2020, Bingham signed for National League South side Ebbsfleet United.

Career statistics

References

External links

1993 births
Living people
English footballers
Association football forwards
Wigan Athletic F.C. players
Falkirk F.C. players
Mansfield Town F.C. players
Hartlepool United F.C. players
Hamilton Academical F.C. players
Cheltenham Town F.C. players
Doncaster Rovers F.C. players
Dundee United F.C. players
Ebbsfleet United F.C. players
Scottish Professional Football League players
Expatriate footballers in Scotland
Footballers from the London Borough of Newham
English Football League players
National League (English football) players
Black British sportspeople